
Year 189 BC was a year of the pre-Julian Roman calendar. At the time it was known as the Year of the Consulship of Nobilior and Vulso (or, less frequently, year 565 Ab urbe condita). The denomination 189 BC for this year has been used since the early medieval period, when the Anno Domini calendar era became the prevalent method in Europe for naming years.

Events 
 By place 
 Roman Republic 
 Cato the Elder criticizes the consul Marcus Fulvius Nobilior for giving awards to Roman soldiers for doing ordinary tasks, such as digging wells.

 Greece 
 The defeat of Antiochus III by the Romans in the Battle of Magnesia robs the Aetolian League of its principal foreign ally and makes it impossible for them to stand alone in continued opposition to Rome. The League is forced to sign a peace treaty with Rome that makes it a subject ally of the Republic. Although the League continues to exist in name, the power of the League is broken by the treaty and it never again constitutes a significant political or military force.

 Asia Minor 
 The Romans under consul Gnaeus Manlius Vulso, along with a Pergamene army under Eumenes II, defeat the Galatians in Anatolia and make them subjects of Pergamum.
 The city of Philadelphia (now Alaşehir, Turkey) is founded by King Eumenes II of Pergamon. Eumenes names the city after his brother, Attalus, whose loyalty earns him the nickname, "Philadelphus", literally meaning "one who loves his brother".
 The territory of Artsakh first became known for being inhabited by Armenians-notably within the city of Tigranakert, one of four cities named after Tigranes the Great in the ancient Armenian empire.

Deaths 
 Fan Kuai, Chinese general and politician of the Han Dynasty (during the Chu-Han Contention) 
 Liu Fei, Chinese prince and proclaimed king of the former Qi State (Zhou Dynasty) (b. 221 BC)
 Zhang Liang, Chinese rebel and taoist, who has helped Liu Bang establish the Han Dynasty (b. 262 BC)

References